Orixa japonica, commonly called East Asian orixa or Japanese orixa, is a deciduous shrub growing to  with an equal spread. Native to Japan and South Korea, it is found on forested, sunny slopes at elevations from 500 to 1300 m.
A recent scientific study found this plant to contain previously unknown alkaloids that may be effective against Plasmodium falciparum, one of the protozoan species that cause human malaria.

This plant has an unusual and distinctive leaf pattern. Starting from the oldest leaf, the pattern of angles of subsequent leaves is 180 degrees, 90 degrees, 180 degrees, and 270 degrees. The pattern then repeats.

References

External links
Photo Database from University of South Florida 

Flora of Japan
Flora of Korea
Zanthoxyloideae
Plants described in 1784